Aryna Sabalenka was the defending champion, but chose to participate in Taipei instead.

Mihaela Buzărnescu won the title, defeating Tamara Zidanšek in the final, 6–0, 6–1.

Seeds

Draw

Finals

Top half

Bottom half

References
Main Draw

Dunlop World Challenge - Singles
Dunlop World Challenge